Xavier Koller (born 1944, Schwyz, Switzerland) is a Swiss film director and screenwriter. He is most known for his work on the Disney live action film Squanto: A Warrior's Tale, an adventure historical fiction film based on the life of Squanto, and his film Journey of Hope, which won the Academy Award for Best Foreign Language Film in 1990.

Early life
After graduating from high school, Koller first went through a four-year apprenticeship as a precision toolmaker and then, after three years of training at the Academy of Drama in Zurich, Switzerland, graduated as an actor/director. The next several years he spent acting and directing at German and Swiss theatres. He did a number of TV-plays as an actor, directed commercials, acted in movies, and then started to write and direct feature films.

Film career

Awards and accolades

Filmography
Hannibal (1972) (director, screenplay)
Mädchen, die am Wege liegen (1976) (director: additional scenes)
Trilogie 1848 - Der Galgensteiger (1978) (director, writer) (TV film)
The Frozen Heart (Das gefrorene Herz) (1979) (director, screenplay)
Tanner (Der schwarze Tanner) (1985) (director, writer)
Journey of Hope (Reise der Hoffnung) (1990) (director, writer)
Squanto: A Warrior's Tale (1994) (director)
Gripsholm (2000) (director)
Cowboy Up (2001) (director)
 (2002) (director, writer) (short film)
 (2006) (director) (TV film)
 (2011) (director, writer)
 (2013) (director)
 (2015) (director, writer)

References

External links

Xavier Koller at the Swiss Film Directory

Living people
Swiss film directors
Swiss screenwriters
Male screenwriters
1944 births
German-language film directors
Zurich University of the Arts alumni
Directors of Best Foreign Language Film Academy Award winners